This article lists the Alliance Party of Northern Ireland's election results in UK parliamentary elections.

Summary of general election performance

February 1974 general election

October 1974 general election

1979 general election

By-elections, 1979–83

1983 general election

By-elections, 1983–87

1987 general election

By-elections, 1987–92

1992 general election

By-elections, 1992–97

1997 general election

By-elections, 1997–2001

2001 general election

2005 general election

2010 general election

By-elections, 2010–15

2015 general election

2017 general election

By-elections, 2017–2019

2019 general election

References

F. W. S. Craig, Chronology of British Parliamentary By-elections 1833–1987
UK General election results February 1974, Richard Kimber's Political Resources
UK General election results October 1974, Richard Kimber's Political Resources
UK General election results May 1979, Richard Kimber's Political Resources

Alliance Party of Northern Ireland
Election results by party in the United Kingdom